Hiekeia pedunculata is a species of beetle in the family Cerambycidae, and the only species in the genus Hiekeia. It was described by Breuning in 1964.

References

Acanthocinini
Beetles described in 1964
Monotypic beetle genera
Taxa named by Stephan von Breuning (entomologist)